The 2004 Princeton Tigers football team was an American football team that represented Princeton University during the 2004 NCAA Division I-AA football season. The Tigers tied for fourth in the Ivy League.

In their fifth year under head coach Roger Hughes, the Tigers compiled a 5–5 record, and outscored opponents 211 to 207. Justin Stull and Jon Veach were the team captains.

Princeton's 3–4 conference record placed it in a three-way tie for fourth place in the Ivy League standings. The Tigers were outscored 143 to 126 by Ivy opponents. 

The Tigers played their home games at Princeton Stadium on the university campus in Princeton, New Jersey.

Schedule

References

Princeton
Princeton Tigers football seasons
Princeton Tigers football